Nezuko may refer to:

Nezuko, a name for Thuja standishii, a species of conifer
Nezuko Kamado, a character in the manga series Demon Slayer: Kimetsu no Yaiba